Meryem Erdoğan (formerly Mariam Tanga or Mariam Hana Dingo, born April 24, 1990) is an Ethiopian-born Turkish long-distance runner.

In 2012 Erdoğan was banned for two years after doping.

Personal life
She was born on April 24, 1990 in Ethiopia. Impressed by her countrywoman Elvan Abeylegesse, who became a renowned athlete after acquiring Turkish citizenship, she decided to go to Turkey in order to become an athlete there. In 2006, at age of 16, she illegally immigrated to Turkey via Beirut, Lebanon.
She was caught by police in Istanbul, however barely escaped deportation. Following adventurous times, she was acknowledged as a talented athlete candidate by Ertan Hatipoğlu, the former coach of Abeylegesse. Her application for Turkish citizenship was accepted in January 2010. She took the Turkish name Meryem and chose as surname Erdoğan for her admiration of the Turkish prime minister Recep Tayyip Erdoğan.

Sports career
Rejected initially by the clubs Enkaspor and Fenerbahçe Athletics due to her illegal status, Meryem Erdoğan was admitted to Kasımpaşaspor in Istanbul and finally entered Kocaeli Büyükşehir Belediyesi Kağıt Spor Kulübü in İzmit, where she is being coached by Öznur Dursun, a former national female athlete.

She participated at various international long-distance runs held in Turkey under her Ethiopian identification as Mariam Tanga or Mariam Hana Dingo. In 2009, she placed second at the half marathon in Trabzon and fourth in the 15 km run at the 31st Eurasia Marathon in Istanbul. In March of the same year, she won the 10 km road run of the 4th International Runtalya Marathon in Antalya with a time of 33:09.

Her international debut following her acquirement of a Turkish passport was at the Papaflessia international meeting held in Kalamata, Greece on May 29, 2010, where she won the 1500 m event in 4:16.92. At her next international participation, the 14th European Cup 10000m held on June 5, 2010 in Marseille, France, she placed fourth in a personal best time of 31:55.53.

On July 28, 2010, Erdoğan finished fifth in the 10000 m final at the European Championships in Barcelona, Spain, clocking a new personal best of 31:44.86. Four days later, on August 1, 2010, she finished seventh in the 5000 m final, in another personal best time of 15:14.92. She became the women's under-23 champion at the 2010 European Cross Country Championships, winning by a margin of nine seconds.

In 2012 Erdoğan was banned for two years after doping.

Performance progression

References

External links 

 

1990 births
Living people
Naturalized citizens of Turkey
Turkish female long-distance runners
Ethiopian female long-distance runners
Turkish sportspeople in doping cases
Ethiopian emigrants to Turkey
Kocaeli Büyükşehir Belediyesi Kağıt Spor athletes
Doping cases in athletics
Turkish female marathon runners
Athletes (track and field) at the 2016 Summer Olympics
Olympic athletes of Turkey
Athletes (track and field) at the 2020 Summer Olympics
Olympic female marathon runners